Chemnitz is a city in Saxony, Germany.

Chemnitz may also refer to:

Places
 Chemnitz (region), one of the former regions of Saxony, disbanded 2012
 Chemnitz (river), river in Saxony, Germany
 Chemnitzer Land, former district in Saxony, Germany

People with the surname
 Johann Hieronymus Chemnitz (1730–1800), German theologian and natural scientist
 Martin Chemnitz (1522–1586), German Lutheran theologian

Other
 SS Chemnitz, steamship of the North German Lloyd line

See also
 Dorfchemnitz
 Kemnitz